Hanan Maman (born 28 August 1989) is an Israeli professional footballer who plays as a midfielder for Hapoel Haifa. Hanan Maman is the son of former footballer Baruch Maman.

Career statistics

Honours
Hapoel Be'er Sheva
Israeli Premier League: 2017–18

Individual
 Israeli Footballer of the Year: 2017–18

External links

Living people
1989 births
Israeli Jews
Israeli footballers
Association football midfielders
Israel international footballers
Hapoel Haifa F.C. players
Hapoel Tel Aviv F.C. players
S.K. Beveren players
Beitar Jerusalem F.C. players
Hapoel Be'er Sheva F.C. players
Liga Leumit players
Israeli Premier League players
Belgian Pro League players
Israeli expatriate footballers
Expatriate footballers in Belgium
Israeli expatriate sportspeople in Belgium
Footballers from Haifa
Israeli people of Tunisian-Jewish descent
Israeli people of Moroccan-Jewish descent
Israeli Footballer of the Year recipients